Téguéréya  is a town and sub-prefecture in the Mamou Prefecture in the Mamou Region of Guinea.

References

Sub-prefectures of the Mamou Region